Proto 2 was a training biplane manufactured at the Fabrica de avioane Astra in Arad in 1924.

Design and development
Following the accident of Ioan Sava, a new variant of the Proto 1 was created, called the Proto 2. The airplane kept the original design, but as a safety measure, the structure of the wings was strengthened by increasing the section of the spars and adding another pair of interplane struts.

Service

After these improvements were made, the Astra Factory built 25 aircraft. The airplanes were then supplied to the Ministry of War, which assigned them to the Military Flying School of Tecuci.

Specifications

References

Single-engined tractor aircraft
Aircraft first flown in 1924
Ștefan Protopopescu
1920s Romanian military aircraft
Biplanes